The role of the Director of Audit is to ensure the financial order of the Hong Kong Government and heads the Audit Commission. This role is similar to that of Auditors General or auditors in other jurisdictions. The director reports directly to the Chief Executive of Hong Kong.

List of Directors of Audit
The current and 25th Director of Audit is Nelson Lam Chi-yuen, having assumed the role in July 2022.

References

External links
Government of HKSAR
Organisation chart of Hong Kong Government

Audit, Director of
Hong Kong